Claix is the name of 2 communes in France:

 Claix, Charente
 Claix, Isère